Bisky is a surname. Notable people with the surname include:

Lothar Bisky (1941–2013), German politician
Norbert Bisky (born 1970), German painter